John Michael Smyth (born 28 April 1970) is an Irish former professional footballer. He played as a full back and made eight appearances in the Football League for Wigan Athletic.

References

1970 births
Living people
People from Dundalk
Association footballers from County Louth
Republic of Ireland association footballers
Association football defenders
Liverpool F.C. players
Burnley F.C. players
Wigan Athletic F.C. players
English Football League players
Limerick F.C. players
League of Ireland players
Glenavon F.C. players
Ballymena United F.C. players
NIFL Premiership players